Lim Biow Chuan (born 1963) is a Singaporean politician and lawyer who served as Deputy Speaker of the Parliament of Singapore between 2016 and 2020. A member of the governing People's Action Party (PAP), he has been the Member of Parliament (MP) representing Mountbatten SMC since 2011 and previously the Mountbatten division of Marine Parade GRC between 2006 and 2011.

Education 
Lim studied at Victoria School and Temasek Junior College before he went on to the National University of Singapore's Faculty of Law, where he completed a Bachelor of Laws. When he was in university, he was a classmate of Sylvia Lim, who later became a Member of Parliament from the opposition Workers' Party.

Career

Legal career 
Lim has been a practising lawyer since 1989. He is a senior partner in Derrick Wong & Lim BC LLP and has been appointed as a Notary Public and Commissioner for Oaths.

Political career 
Lim entered politics during the 2006 general elections when he joined the People's Action Party (PAP) team contesting in Marine Parade GRC and they won by an uncontested walkover. He is the president of the Consumers Association of Singapore (CASE), the only politician on the central committee of the non-governmental organisation. Lim is also the chairman of the Marine Parade Town Council.

In 2013, Lim was appointed as a member of Singapore's Data Protection Advisory Committee.

On 25 January 2016, Lim was elected Deputy Speaker of Parliament along with Charles Chong.

Incident 
In 2010, the press reported that Lim showed support for film director Jack Neo over his controversial extramarital affair, saying, "Since he is remorseful over this incident, he should be forgiven. Actually, a man who has a good career development, like himself, would find such scenarios unavoidable". Lim later stated that he had been misquoted by the press.

Personal life 
Lim is married and has two daughters. Lim has been serving as a church leader since 1993.

References

External links
 Lim Biow Chuan on Parliament of Singapore
 

1963 births
Living people
Members of the Parliament of Singapore
Singaporean people of Hokkien descent
People's Action Party politicians
20th-century Singaporean lawyers
National University of Singapore alumni
Victoria School, Singapore alumni
Temasek Junior College alumni
Singaporean Christians